Josef Alexander Pasternack (7 July 1881 – 29 April 1940) was a conductor and composer in the first half of the 20th century.

Biography

He was born in Częstochowa, Poland in 1881, the eldest son of Sigmund and Dora Pasternack. He had two younger brothers, Samuel and David. His father and grandfather had been bandmasters in Poland and he began the study of the violin at age four, under his father's tutelage. At age ten he entered the Warsaw Conservatory of Music, where he initially studied piano and composition. He also took up the study of a new instrument each month, so that by the time he left the Conservatory he could play every instrument in the orchestra except the harp.

At age 15 he came to the United States with his two brothers and father. Initially he worked in a hotel restaurant as a busboy. One day when the violin player for the hotel band did not come to work, he informed the bandleader that he was capable of filling in. He ran home and got his violin and returned to play. The regular violinist was not allowed to return. He was able to convince the bandleader to permit his brothers to try out, and so they began their musical careers in America. Shortly thereafter, he toured the country as a concert pianist. In 1902, he was hired as viola player with the Metropolitan Opera Orchestra in New York and then became first viola player, continuing until 1909. His ability came to the attention of the famed Arturo Toscanini, who had become principal conductor at the Met in 1908, and Pasternack was made assistant conductor in 1909, a position he filled for one year.

In 1911 he returned to Europe as conductor of the Bremen Opera, but the Metropolitan asked for his release and he returned to the Met as a conductor for 1911-13. During the period 1913-26, he was conductor of the Century Opera Company in New York, the Chicago Symphony Orchestra, the Boston Symphony Orchestra, and the Philadelphia Philharmonic Society. While at the Philadelphia Philharmonic, he introduced Marian Anderson as the first African-American singer to perform there.  In 1916 he became music director of the Victor Talking Machine Company (later RCA Victor) alongside  Rosario Bourdon, where likewise he (Pasternack) introduced Marian Anderson; and the Stanley Company of America, owned by Warner Brothers. In his role at Victor and with several orchestras he made recordings and conducted  programs for many famous singers and instrumentalists of the day, including  Enrico Caruso, Fritz Kreisler and Jascha Heifetz. From 1928 until his death in 1940 he conducted orchestras for NBC Radio, including a program with Nelson Eddy and The Carnation Contented Hour. He composed songs and music for motion pictures and radio, and wrote the lyrics for "Taps".

He was married in 1904 to Helen Feirman, and had two daughters, Florence and Cecile.

External links
 Josef Pasternack recordings at the Discography of American Historical Recordings.

References

Polish conductors (music)
Male conductors (music)
People from Częstochowa
1881 births
1940 deaths
Chopin University of Music alumni
20th-century conductors (music)
20th-century male musicians
Congress Poland emigrants to the United States